Attila Simon (born 9 October 1979) is a Hungarian footballer who currently plays as a midfielder for Békéscsaba 1912 Előre SE.

External links
 Profile 

1979 births
Living people
People from Békéscsaba
Hungarian footballers
Association football midfielders
Újpest FC players
Békéscsaba 1912 Előre footballers
Fehérvár FC players
Diósgyőri VTK players
Dunaújváros FC players
Kaposvölgye VSC footballers
Sportspeople from Békés County